Joaquim Machado de Castro (19 June 1731 – 17 November 1822) was one of Portugal's foremost sculptors. He wrote extensively on his works and the theory behind them, including a full-length discussion of the statue of King Joseph I entitled Descripção analytica da execução da estatua equestre, Lisbon 1810.

Life 
Machado de Castro was born in Coimbra, and was a celebrated figure throughout Europe in the eighteenth and early nineteenth centuries. The Descripção is the artist's detailed comments on the style and execution of his finest work, the equestrian statue of D. José I, erected in 1775 as part of the rebuilding of central Lisbon after the disastrous earthquake of 1755. The stages of construction are illustrated with sections and cross-sections of the horse and rider, views of the statue from different angles, and details of armor and ornamentation. This bronze statue remains one of Lisbon's most important monuments, and dominates one of the major squares of Europe, the Praça do Comércio or Terreiro do Paço. In the introduction, Machado de Castro comments on similar works of art in the rest of Europe.

Machado de Castro had a famous school and was the Master of many sculptors. He died in Lisbon. In Coimbra there is a prestigious art museum named in his honour, the Machado de Castro National Museum.

1731 births
1822 deaths
Portuguese sculptors
Male sculptors
People from Coimbra
18th-century Portuguese people
19th-century Portuguese people
19th-century sculptors